Teresa Piotrowska (born 5 February 1955) is a Polish politician. She was elected to the Sejm on 25 September 2005, getting 16,716 votes in 4 Bydgoszcz district, as a candidate from the Civic Platform list.

Piotrowska was also a member of Sejm 2001-2005. Piotrowska was the interior minister of Poland from September 2014 to November 2015.

She was born in Tczew, Poland.

See also
Members of Polish Sejm 2005-2007

References

External links
Teresa Piotrowska - parliamentary page - includes declarations of interest, voting record, and transcripts of speeches.
Teresa Piotrowska - home page

1955 births
Living people
People from Tczew
PAX Association members
Christian National Union politicians
Civic Platform politicians
Members of the Polish Sejm 2005–2007
Members of the Polish Sejm 2001–2005
Interior ministers of Poland
Women government ministers of Poland
Women members of the Sejm of the Republic of Poland
21st-century Polish women politicians
Female interior ministers
Members of the Polish Sejm 2007–2011
Members of the Polish Sejm 2011–2015
20th-century Polish women